In mathematics, specifically statistics and information geometry, a Bregman divergence or Bregman distance is a measure of difference between two points, defined in terms of a strictly convex function; they form an important class of divergences. When the points are interpreted as probability distributions – notably as either values of the parameter of a parametric model or as a data set of observed values – the resulting distance is a statistical distance. The most basic Bregman divergence is the squared Euclidean distance.

Bregman divergences are similar to metrics, but satisfy neither the triangle inequality (ever) nor symmetry (in general). However, they satisfy a generalization of the Pythagorean theorem, and in information geometry the corresponding statistical manifold is interpreted as a (dually) flat manifold. This allows many techniques of optimization theory to be generalized to Bregman divergences, geometrically as generalizations of least squares.

Bregman divergences are named after Russian mathematician Lev M. Bregman, who introduced the concept in 1967.

Definition 
Let   be a continuously-differentiable, strictly convex function defined on a convex set .

The Bregman distance associated with F for points  is the difference between the value of F at point p and the value of the first-order Taylor expansion of F around point q evaluated at point p:

Properties 
 Non-negativity:  for all , .
 Positivity: When  is strictly convex,  iff .
 Uniqueness up to affine difference:  iff  is an affine function.
 Convexity:  is convex in its first argument, but not necessarily in the second argument. If F is strictly convex, then  is strictly convex in its first argument. 
 For example, Take f(x) = |x|, smooth it at 0, then take , then .
 Linearity: If we think of the Bregman distance as an operator on the function F, then it is linear with respect to non-negative coefficients.

 Duality: If F is strictly convex, then the function F has a convex conjugate  which is also strictly convex and continuously differentiable on some convex set .

 Mean as minimizer: A key result about Bregman divergences is that, given a random vector, the mean vector minimizes the expected Bregman divergence from the random vector.  This result generalizes the textbook result that the mean of a set minimizes total squared error to elements in the set.  This result was proved for the vector case by (Banerjee et al. 2005), and extended to the case of functions/distributions by (Frigyik et al. 2008). This result is important because it further justifies using a mean as a representative of a random set, particularly in Bayesian estimation.
If  is closed, then  is compact for all .
 Law of cosines:
For any 

 Parallelogram law: for any ,

 Bregman projection: For any , define the "Bregman projection" of  onto :
. Then 
 if  is convex, then the projection is unique if it exists;
 Generalized Pythagorean Theorem:
For any ,

In particular, this always happens when  is an affine set.

 Lack of triangle inequality: Since the Bregman divergence is essentially a generalization of squared Euclidean distance, there is no triangle inequality. Indeed, which may be positive or negative.

Proofs 

 Non-negativity and positivity: use Jensen's inequality.
 Convexity in the first argument: by definition, and use convexity of F. Same for strict convexity.
 Linearity in F, law of cosines, parallelogram law: by definition.
 Duality: See figure 1 of.
 Bregman balls are bounded, and compact if X is closed:

Fix  .

 for all .

Since  is strictly convex, . Then .

 Projection  is well-defined when  is closed and convex.

Fix . Then draw the Bregman ball . It is closed and bounded, thus compact.

 Pythagorean inequality.

Thus .

Classification theorems 

The only divergence on  that is both a Bregman divergence and an f-divergence is the Kullback–Leibler divergence.
If , then any Bregman divergence on  that satisfies the data processing inequality must be the Kullback–Leibler divergence. (In fact, a weaker assumption of "sufficiency" is enough.) Counterexamples exist when .
For example, the Kullback-Leiber divergence is both a Bregman divergence and an f-divergence. Its reverse is also an f-divergence, but by the above characterization, the reverse KL divergence cannot be a Bregman divergence.

Examples 

 Squared Euclidean distance  is the canonical example of a Bregman distance, generated by the convex function 
 The squared Mahalanobis distance,  which is generated by the convex function . This can be thought of as a generalization of the above squared Euclidean distance.
 The generalized Kullback–Leibler divergence
 
is generated by the negative entropy function 

When restricted to the simplex, this gives , the usual Kullback–Leibler divergence.

 The Itakura–Saito distance,

is generated by the convex function

Generalizing projective duality 
A key tool in computational geometry is the idea of projective duality, which maps points to hyperplanes and vice versa, while preserving incidence and above-below relationships. There are numerous analytical forms of the projective dual: one common form maps the point  to the hyperplane . This mapping can be interpreted (identifying the hyperplane with its normal) as the convex conjugate mapping that takes the point p to its dual point , where F defines the d-dimensional paraboloid .

If we now replace the paraboloid by an arbitrary convex function, we obtain a different dual mapping that retains the incidence and above-below properties of the standard projective dual. This implies that natural dual concepts in computational geometry like Voronoi diagrams and Delaunay triangulations retain their meaning in distance spaces defined by an arbitrary Bregman divergence. Thus, algorithms from "normal" geometry extend directly to these spaces (Boissonnat, Nielsen and Nock, 2010)

Generalization of Bregman divergences 
Bregman divergences can be interpreted as limit cases of skewed Jensen divergences (see Nielsen and Boltz, 2011). Jensen divergences can be generalized using comparative convexity, and limit cases of these skewed Jensen divergences generalizations yields generalized Bregman divergence (see Nielsen and Nock, 2017).
The Bregman chord divergence is obtained by taking a chord instead of a tangent line.

Bregman divergence on other objects 
Bregman divergences can also be defined between matrices, between functions, and between measures (distributions).  Bregman divergences between matrices include the Stein's loss and von Neumann entropy.  Bregman divergences between functions include total squared error, relative entropy, and squared bias; see the references by Frigyik et al. below for definitions and properties. Similarly Bregman divergences have also been defined over sets, through a submodular set function which is known as the discrete analog of a convex function. The submodular Bregman divergences subsume a number of discrete distance measures, like the Hamming distance, precision and recall, mutual information and some other set based distance measures (see Iyer & Bilmes, 2012) for more details and properties of the submodular Bregman.)

For a list of common matrix Bregman divergences, see Table 15.1 in.

Applications 

In machine learning, Bregman divergences are used to calculate the bi-tempered logistic loss, performing better than the softmax function with noisy datasets.

Bregman divergence is used in the formulation of mirror descent, which includes optimization algorithms used in machine learning such as gradient descent and the hedge algorithm.

References 

 

 
 

Geometric algorithms
Statistical distance